The Women's mass start competition at the 2021 World Single Distances Speed Skating Championships was held on 13 February 2021.

Results

Semifinals
The first eight racers from each semifinal advanced to the final.

Semifinal 1
The race was started at 13:45.

Semifinal 2
The race was started at 14:04.

Final
The final was started at 16:58.

References

Women's mass start
2021 in women's speed skating